Dennis Francis O'Brien (born 10 June 1949) is a Canadian former professional ice hockey defenceman who played in the National Hockey League (NHL). He featured in the 1978 Stanley Cup Finals with the Boston Bruins.

O'Brien is the uncle of former NHL player Shane O'Brien.

Playing career
O'Brien was selected by the Minnesota North Stars in the second round, 14th overall, of the 1969 NHL Amateur Draft, and played for the North Stars for the majority of his career, from 1970–71 to 1977–78. During his final season with the North Stars, he played just 13 games before being traded to the Colorado Rockies. After 16 games with the Rockies, he was traded to the Cleveland Barons and after 23 games as a Baron, he was traded to his fourth team of the season, the Boston Bruins, where he played 16 games. The final trade to the Bruins broke an NHL record for the most teams played for in one season. That record has since been equalled by Dave McLlwain in 1991–92, Mark Arcobello in 2014-15 and Jussi Jokinen in 2017-18.

After that busy season, O'Brien played parts of two more seasons in the NHL, both for the Bruins.

Career statistics

See also
List of family relations in the NHL

References

External links

1949 births
Living people
Binghamton Dusters players
Boston Bruins players
Canadian ice hockey defencemen
Canadian people of Irish descent
Cleveland Barons (NHL) players
Colorado Rockies (NHL) players
Ice hockey people from Ontario
Iowa Stars (CHL) players
Minnesota North Stars draft picks
Minnesota North Stars players
People from Northumberland County, Ontario
Rochester Americans players
St. Catharines Black Hawks players